Region I (Spanish: Región 1. Chimalhuacán) is an intrastate region within the State of Mexico, one of 16.  It borders the states of Puebla in the east corner of the state.  The region comprises thirteen municipalities: Chimalhuacán, Chicoloapan, Ixtapaluca, Chalco de Solidaridad.  It is largely rural.

Municipalities 
Chicoloapan
Ixtapaluca

References

Regions of the State of Mexico